The women's dual moguls at the 2011 Asian Winter Games was held on 3 February 2011 at Tabagan Sport and Recreation Complex in Almaty, Kazakhstan.

Schedule
All times are Almaty Time (UTC+06:00)

Results

Qualification

Knockout round

References

Results

External links
Official website

Women's dual moguls